Petit Copter is a remote-control simulation video game for the PlayStation 2, Xbox and Windows that involves piloting a helicopter.

Remake
A remake for Wii was in development around 2007 by Arc System Works and Sonic Powered and released in 2008.

There are said to be three modes of play:
 Taking off and landing
 Picking up objects with a suction cup
 Shooting targets with a puff of air

References

External links
Petit Copter for the PS2 at Gamespy
Petit Copter for the Xbox at Gamespy
Petit Copter 2 for the PC at Gamespy
Current development screenshots

2002 video games
Arc System Works games
Helicopter video games
Japan-exclusive video games
Video games developed in Japan
Wii games
PlayStation 2 games
Windows games
Xbox games